The Stuttgart Metropolitan Region is a metropolitan region in south-west Germany consisting of the cities and regions around Stuttgart, Heilbronn, Tübingen/Reutlingen. These cities are arranged into three agglomeration areas. The population of the area is about 5,300,000 and it is one of the biggest regions in Germany. 
This area covers an area of ca 15,000 km².

The Stuttgart metropolitan region is roughly 200 km south of Frankfurt, 200 km west of Munich and about 600 km east of Paris. 
Other metropolitan areas around are Rhine-Neckar, Frankfurt Rhine-Main, Nuremberg Metropolitan and Munich Metropolitan.

The region is one of the economically strongest regions in Germany and Europe.
Many well-known companies like Daimler, Porsche, Bosch, Mahle, Lidl, Kaufland, Würth, Märklin, Stihl, Kärcher, Trumpf and Festo have their worldwide headquarters in the region.
Furthermore many small and medium-size hidden champions are located in the region, forming the German Mittelstand.
International companies like IBM, Hewlett-Packard, Intersport, Euronics and FrieslandCampina have their German headquarters in the region as well.

Culturally the region is mostly Swabian, with some Franconian parts in the north.
The region has a strong wine and beer tradition with many wine and beer festivals round the year. Most notably are the Cannstatter Volksfest (an Oktoberfest-like celebration that occurs twice a year), the Stuttgart wine festival and the Heilbronn wine festival.
Typical dishes of the region are Maultaschen, Spätzle (e.g. as Linsen mit Spätzle), Flädle soup, Schupfnudeln and Zwiebelrostbraten.

Maps

See also
Stuttgart Region

References

Metropolitan areas of Germany
Stuttgart (region)
Planning regions in Baden-Württemberg